"It's Not Over" is a song written by Mark Wright and Larry Kingston, and recorded by American country music singer Mark Chesnutt. Originally found on his 1992 album Longnecks & Short Stories, the song was also included on his 1997 album Thank God for Believers,

History
The song was originally recorded under the title "It's Not Over (If I'm Not Over You)" by Reba McEntire on her 1984 album My Kind of Country. Mark Chesnutt included his version of the song on his 1992 album Longnecks & Short Stories, but did not release it as a single at the time. His rendition of the song features backing vocals from Vince Gill and Alison Krauss.

Five years later, he put the original version on his 1997 album Thank God for Believers. Chesnutt chose to put the song on the album in order to replace a song that he felt did not fit thematically with the rest of the album. Regarding its placement on the album, he said that "When we put it up against the other songs, you would never know it was recorded so long ago." He also chose to make it a single because he "always thought that song had a place on radio".

Critical reception
A review from Billboard was favorable, praising Chesnutt's "heartbroken hillbilly delivery", the presence of steel guitar and fiddle in the production, and the harmony vocals.

Personnel
From Thank God for Believers liner notes.
Pat Flynn - acoustic guitar
Paul Franklin - steel guitar
Vince Gill - background vocals
Rob Hajacos - fiddle
Alison Krauss - background vocals
Paul Leim - drums
Hargus "Pig" Robbins - piano
Brent Rowan - electric guitar
Biff Watson - acoustic guitar
Bob Wray - bass guitar

Chart performance
The song was the "Hot Shot Debut", meaning the highest-debuting song of the week, on the Hot Country Songs chart published for December 13, 1997, where it entered at No. 53.

References

1984 songs
1997 singles
Reba McEntire songs
Mark Chesnutt songs
Vince Gill songs
Alison Krauss songs
Songs written by Mark Wright (record producer)
Song recordings produced by Mark Wright (record producer)
Vocal collaborations